Alexander Durley Sports Complex is a 5,500-seat multi-purpose stadium in Houston, Texas. It was home to the Texas Southern Tigers football team through the 2011 season. The facility is named after former Tiger head coach, Alexander Durley.

In 2012, the Tigers moved into the new PNC Stadium, a soccer-specific stadium that is also home to the Houston Dynamo of Major League Soccer.

The Alexander Durley Sports Complex is currently home to the Texas Southern University soccer team.

References

Defunct college football venues
Sports venues in Houston
American football venues in Houston
Multi-purpose stadiums in the United States
Texas Southern Tigers football